The Paris Pride or Marche des Fiertés LGBT, is a parade and festival held at the end of June each year in Paris, France to celebrate the lesbian, gay, bisexual, and transgender (LGBT) people and their allies. The parade starts each year at Tour Montparnasse and ends at Place de la Bastille. After the parade the party continues in the gay district Le Marais.

History 
Paris was the host of Europride in 1997. Paris Pride began in 2001.

In 2011 an estimated 36,000 people attended the event, whose theme was "gay marriage".

The event's theme in 2018 was "discrimination in sport". Some attendees criticized this theme as glossing over larger issues for the LGBTQ community.

In 2021 an estimated 30,000 people attended the event.

Gallery

See also 

 LGBT culture in Paris
 Amsterdam Gay Pride
 Berlin Pride
 Pride London

References

External links 

 Official website, Paris Gay Pride

Festivals in Paris
Pride parades in Europe
LGBT festivals in France
Recurring events established in 1981
Parades in France
LGBT culture in Paris